Stylida railway station is a railway station in Greece. The station opened 1905, along with the rest of the line. It is served by Regional services to Leianokladi.

History
The station opened 1905, along with the rest of the line. In 1920 the line became part of the Hellenic State Railways. In 1971, the Hellenic State Railways was reorganised into the OSE taking over responsibilities for most for Greece's rail infrastructure. However, by 1970 the regular passenger itineraries from Piraeus and Athens to Lamia and Stylida were suspended, and only the periodic summer excursion itineraries for the transport of bathers to the beach of Agia Marina and the commercial itineraries remained. In 1991, the line Athens Leianokladi-Lamia-Stylida is reopened with passenger trains and freight services. In 2011 the passenger operation of the line is transformed into a suburban line with 12 pairs of routes, 7 between Leianokladi-Lamia-Stylida and the remaining 5 between Leianokladi-Lamia. This connecting bus connected the OSE agency in Lamia with the Leianokladi station.

Facilities
The station has waiting rooms and staffed booking office within the original brick-built station building. The station has a buffet. Basic shelters are located on Platform 2 and digital display screens on both platforms. There is a taxi rank in the forecourt, with a postbox at the front entrance. However, there is no onsite parking at the station.

Services
It is served by Regional services to Leianokladi. The station sees around 8 trains per day.

Station layout

References

Railway stations in Central Greece
Railway stations opened in 1905
Buildings and structures in Phthiotis